Andre Smith (born April 20, 1997) is an American football linebacker for the Tennessee Titans of the National Football League (NFL). He played college football at North Carolina.

High school
Smith attended Trinity Christian Academy in Jacksonville, Florida. As a senior, he tallied 65 tackles with 5.5 being for loss. He committed to play football for the North Carolina Tar Heels in October 2013.

College career

Freshman Season
As a true freshman in 2015, Smith played in all of North Carolina's 14 games. He tallied 53 tackles, two being for losses, one interception, one pass breakup, and one forced fumble.

Sophomore Season
In 2016, Smith played in all 13 games, starting 12 of them at middle linebacker. He made 113 tackles, second on the team, along with one interception, one sack, three pass deflections, and one forced fumble.

Junior Season
As a junior in 2017, Smith suffered a knee injury in North Carolina's second game against Louisville, forcing him to miss the remainder of the season. In only two games, he tallied 21 tackles and a 73 yard interception return. After the season, he declared for the 2018 NFL Draft.

Professional career

Carolina Panthers
Smith was drafted by the Carolina Panthers in seventh round (234th overall) of the 2018 NFL Draft, using the 7th round pick acquired from a trade that sent Kelvin Benjamin to the Buffalo Bills.

Buffalo Bills
On August 31, 2020, Smith was traded to the Buffalo Bills for a conditional 2023 seventh-round pick. He was waived on September 5, 2020 and signed to the practice squad the next day. He was elevated to the active roster on September 19, October 13, and October 24 for the team's weeks 2, 5, and 7 games against the Miami Dolphins, Tennessee Titans and New York Jets, and reverted to the practice squad after each game. He was promoted to the active roster on October 27.

On March 6, 2021, Smith signed a two-year contract extension with the Bills.

Smith was suspended the first six games of the 2022 season for violating the league’s policy against performance-enhancing substances. Smith was released from the Bills on October 17, 2022.

Tennessee Titans
On November 15, 2022, Smith was signed to the Tennessee Titans practice squad. He was promoted to the active roster on December 29.

Career statistics

References

External links
North Carolina bio

1997 births
Living people
Players of American football from Jacksonville, Florida
American football linebackers
North Carolina Tar Heels football players
Carolina Panthers players
Buffalo Bills players
Tennessee Titans players